Joseph Thrupp may refer to:

 Joseph Thrupp (died 1821), coachbuilder with Thrupp & Maberly
 Joseph Francis Thrupp (1827–1867), English churchman and academic